The People Next Door may refer to:

 "The People Next Door" (CBS Playhouse), an American CBS Playhouse production
 The People Next Door (1970 film), an American drama directed by David Greene
 The People Next Door (1996 film), an American crime drama television film starring Faye Dunaway
 The People Next Door (Australian TV series), a 1973  comedy-drama series
 The People Next Door (American TV series), a 1989 sitcom